The 1991 World Fencing Championships were held in Budapest, Hungary. The event took place from June 13 to June 23, 1991.

Medal summary

Men's events

Women's events

Medal table

References

FIE Results

World Fencing Championships
International fencing competitions hosted by Hungary
1991 in Hungarian sport
1990s in Budapest
International sports competitions in Budapest
1991 in fencing
June 1991 sports events in Europe